Seung-chul, also spelled Seung-cheol or Sung-chol, is a Korean masculine given name. Its meaning differs based on the hanja used to write each syllable of the name. There are 15 hanja with the reading "seung" and 11 hanja with the reading "chul" on the South Korean government's official list of hanja which may be registered for use in given names.

People with this name include:
Park Seung-cheol (1940–2014), South Korean infectious disease specialist
Lee Seung-chul (born 1966), South Korean singer
Baek Seung-chul (born 1975), South Korean football player
Lee Seung-chul (wrestler) (born 1988), South Korean wrestler

See also
List of Korean given names

References

Korean masculine given names